Adetus lherminieri is a species of beetle in the family Cerambycidae. It was described by Fleutiaux and Sallé in 1889.

References

Adetus
Beetles described in 1889